Graham Scott Sims (born 25 June 1951) is a former New Zealand rugby union player. A centre, Sims represented Otago and Canterbury at a provincial level. He was a member of the New Zealand national side, the All Blacks, in 1972, playing a single test match against the touring Australian team.

He later served as New Zealand's trade commissioner and consul-general to Vietnam, based in Ho Chi Minh City.

References

1951 births
Living people
People from Featherston, New Zealand
University of Otago alumni
New Zealand rugby union players
New Zealand international rugby union players
Otago rugby union players
Canterbury rugby union players
Rugby union centres
New Zealand diplomats
People educated at Whanganui City College
Rugby union players from the Wellington Region